Events from the year 2002 in Moldova.

Incumbents
President: Vladimir Voronin
Prime Minister: Vasile Tarlev

Events 
 February 8–24 - Moldova competes in the 2002 Winter Olympics in Salt Lake City.
 April 23 - The Muzeul Memoriei Neamului is established.

Births

 October 6 – Cleopatra Stratan, singer

Deaths

References

 
Moldova
Years of the 21st century in Moldova
2000s in Moldova
Moldova